Eritza Laues (born 1 May 1983) is a Panamanian-American singer-songwriter, record producer, music publisher, A&R executive, composer and Television personality.

Music career
Eritza is an ASCAP Award winner and Grammy nominated writer. Eritza's songs have been featured in major motion pictures, television shows, film soundtracks, and radio spots, as well as national and international commercial campaigns. Eritza has written songs and vocal produced for many artists in the music industry. Some of Eritza's hitmakers include, Whitney Houston's Love That Man which peeked on the Dance Club Songs Billboard Charts at No. 1. Michael Jackson's Heaven Can Wait which certified gold; and both singles were multi-platinum selling albums worldwide. Being Latina Eritza has also worked with Latin Pop and Latin Urban artists such as Nicky Jam, Sofía Reyes, Prince Royce and Juanes.

Television
In 2016 Eritza served as a vocal coach and mentor on the second season of Univision, La Banda, a Latin American teenage singing competition created by Simon Cowell and produced by Ricky Martin.

Accolades
Eritza is an ASCAP Award winner and a 3x Grammy nominated writer. Many of her songs have made top the top 100 and top 10 of the Billboard charts.

Discography

Production credits

1997
Kenny Lattimore – Weekend
For You

1999
Case – Open Letter
Already Have

2001
Kenny Lattimore – Weekend

Michael Jackson – Invincible
Heaven Can Wait

2002
Gloria Gaynor – I Wish You Love
I Wish You Love

2003
Blu Cantrell – Bittersweet
Happily Ever After
Holding on to Love

Whitney Houston – Just Whitney
Love That Man

2005
Charlie Wilson – Charlie, Last Name Wilson
My Guarantee

2006
Jaheim – Ghetto Classics
Like a DJ

Monrose – Temptation
Push Up on Me

2007
Thara Prashad – Thara
Push Up on Me
Break My Heart

2008
Paula Abdul – Randy Jackson's Music Club, Vol. 1
Dance Like There's No Tomorrow

Monrose – I Am
Certified
Step Aside

2009
Jaheim – Another Round
Ain't Leavin Without You

2010
Prince Royce – Prince Royce
Rock The Pants

2011
Naughty by Nature – Anthem Inc.
God Is Us
Doozit

2013
Jaheim – Appreciation Day
Age Ain't a Factor 
He Don't Exist
What She Really Means 
First Time 
Chase Forever

2016
Jaheim – Struggle Love
Struggle Love

2017
Aston Merrygold – One Night in Paris

Nicky Jam – Fénix
I Can't Forget You

References

External links
Eritza Laues on Discogs

1983 births
Living people
American women singer-songwriters
21st-century African-American women singers